Crumbl Cookies is a franchise chain of bakeries in the United States that specializes in baking a variety of cookies and serving ice cream. Based in Utah, it was started in 2017. As of October 2022, the company has over 600 stores across the United States. The chain maintains a presence in social media.

History and operations 
Crumbl was founded by Sawyer Hemsley and Jason McGowan in 2017 while Hemsley attended Utah State University in Logan, Utah. Hemsley and McGowan utilized A/B testing methods to come up with their final milk chocolate chip cookie recipe.

In 2022, Crumbl sued Crave Cookies and Dirty Dough, two fellow cookie companies, in the United States District Court for the District of Utah. Pursuing a financial award and an injunction, Crumbl's court documents alleged that the defendants had "unique ties" to Crumbl and had a "confusingly similar" "marketing and business model".

Menus rotate weekly to include seven cookie flavors which they share on social media. Crumbl's original concept offered delivery.

Reception 
Mashed.com noted in August 2021 that Crumbl had garnered unfavorable reviews from TikTok users for the quality of cookies customers were receiving through delivery. The article cited four videos of poor-quality cookies that did not arrive as advertised, with one such negative review receiving over 400,000 likes within 21 hours.

Honolulus Emily Smith tried six Crumbl cookies, writing in a 2022 review, "The price is reasonable considering that these are very large cookies packed with flavor. All the cookies looked delicious and visually pleasing. If you love sugar, I recommend trying Crumbl at least once."

Growth 
The company has experienced rapid franchising, which has been attributed to its presence on social media. The company's following on TikTok reached 1.6 million within six weeks in February 2021, and as of 2022 they have over seven million combined followers between TikTok and Instagram.

During the COVID-19 pandemic, Crumbl Cookies expanded to 100 locations by August 2020 and 149 locations across the United States by July 2021. By the end of 2021, the company had grown to over 300 stores in the country, and by July 2022 grew to over 400 locations in 45 states.

Labor law violations 
In December, 2022, the U. S. Department of Labor fined 11 Crumbl Cookie franchises across six U.S. states for violations of child labor laws impacting 46 workers who were minors. Violations included assigning underage employees to shifts that exceeded the permitted hours and to tasks involving "potentially dangerous ovens and machinery". The parent company issued a statement apologizing and affirming their commitment to "a safe and welcoming work environment". Crumbl was fined $57,854 in total for the violations.

Notes

References 

American companies established in 2017
Brand name cookies
Food and drink companies based in Utah
Food and drink companies established in 2017
Franchises